Gündoğdu is a Turkish word and translates to:

People
 Sami Süleyman Gündoğdu Demirel (19
 Gundogdu, son of Suleyman Shah (see Gündoğdu Bey and Sungurtekin Bey)

Places
 Gündoğdu, Biga
 Gündoğdu, Dicle
 Gündoğdu, Gerger, a village in Adıyaman Province, Turkey
 Gündoğdu, İspir
 Gündoğdu, Manavgat, a village in Antalya Province, Turkey
 Gündoğdu, Mustafakemalpaşa
 Gündoğdu, Yenice
 Gündoğdu Square, a city square in İzmir, Turkey

Turkish masculine given names
Turkish-language surnames